Paweł Frenkiel (sometimes also Frenkel, ;
1920–1943) was a Polish Army officer and a Jewish youth leader in Warsaw and one of the senior commanders of the Jewish Military Union, or the ŻZW. Although one of the most important leaders of the Warsaw Ghetto Uprising and the Jewish resistance in the months preceding April 1943, Frenkiel is also one of the least well known to historians, and both his earlier life and his ultimate fate are a subject of some controversy.

Biography
Paweł Frenkiel was born in Warsaw, Poland. At the age of 18 he joined the revisionist Zionist youth movement Betar.

Following the outbreak of World War II, German conquest of Poland and the start of German repressions against the Jewish population of Poland, he joined the Jewish Military Union and became one of its highest-ranking members. It is unclear what his exact capacity was. Earlier publications and accounts by Tadeusz Bednarczyk, Henryk Iwański and Kałmen Mendelson assert, that Paweł Frenkel was one of the deputies of JMU's commander Dawid Moryc Apfelbaum. However, other accounts, including those by Dawid Wdowiński and Cezary Szemley suggest, that Frenkiel was indeed the leader of the entire organisation. In recent years some historians went as far as to suggest that Apfelbaum did not even exist at all.

In any way, it is probable that Paweł Frenkiel personally commanded one of the armed companies of armed fighters during the ill-fated Warsaw Ghetto Uprising of 1943. According to a widespread opinion he was killed in action while defending the headquarters of the Jewish Military Union at #7 Muranów Square. According to some other sources he was killed on 19 June 1943 in Grzybowska Street in Warsaw.

References

External links
 Warsaw Ghetto Uprising leader gets recognition – at last
 "Flags Over the Ghetto". Israeli stamp with Paweł Frenkiel

1920 births
1943 deaths
Polish Zionists
Warsaw Ghetto Uprising insurgents
Jewish Military Union members
Jewish resistance members during the Holocaust
Resistance members killed by Nazi Germany
People who died in the Warsaw Ghetto
Betar members